Wenche Stensvold is a road cyclist from Norway. She won the Norwegian National Time Trial Championships in 1998 and 2000. She represented her nation at the 1998, 2000 and 2002 UCI Road World Championships.

References

External links
 profile at Procyclingstats.com

Norwegian female cyclists
Living people
Place of birth missing (living people)
Year of birth missing (living people)